Clifford Small  is a Canadian politician who is the Member of Parliament for Coast of Bays—Central—Notre Dame, having defeated Liberal incumbent Scott Simms by a close margin of 264 votes in the 2021 general election. He is a member of the Conservative Party of Canada. He is the first Conservative MP from Newfoundland and Labrador since Peter Penashue resigned in 2013. In Newfoundland alone, he is the first Conservative MP elected since 2006. He was appointed Shadow Minister for Atlantic Canada Opportunities Agency by Erin O'Toole on November 9, 2021. He endorsed Pierre Poilievre in the 2022 Conservative Party of Canada leadership election. In October 2022, Poilievre appointed him as Fisheries, Oceans and the Canadian Coast Guard Shadow Minister.

Biography
Small grew up in Wild Cove, White Bay. He was educated at the College of the North Atlantic and graduated in electrical engineering technology. He worked in engineering design until 1994 when he started a fishing business. Following that, he opened three restaurants.

Electoral record

References

External links

Conservative Party of Canada MPs
Members of the House of Commons of Canada from Newfoundland and Labrador
21st-century Canadian politicians
Living people
Businesspeople from Newfoundland and Labrador
Canadian fishers
Canadian restaurateurs
Year of birth missing (living people)